Thelephantins are a group of pigments found in the inedible mushroom Thelephora aurantiotincta.  Chemically, they are classified as polyphenols and terphenyl derivatives. 

Three variants (thelephantin A, B, C) have been elucidated by high-resolution 2D nuclear magnetic resonance, mass spectroscopy, infrared and ultraviolet spectra as well as an acetylated congener of thelephantin A.  The structure of telephantin G was revised and confirmed by total synthesis.

References

Polyphenols
Carboxylate esters